Erythrolamprus taeniurus, the thin ground snake, is a species of snake in the family Colubridae. The species is found in Colombia, Peru, and Bolivia.

References

Erythrolamprus
Reptiles of Colombia]
Reptiles of Bolivia
Reptiles of Peru
Reptiles described in 1845
Taxa named by Johann Jakob von Tschudi